Robert Wilcox or Wilcock may refer to:

Robert Wilcox (actor) (1910–1955), American film actor
Robert William Wilcox (1855–1903), Native Hawaiian revolutionary
Robert Wilcox (martyr), English martyr
Robert Wilcock, MP for New Romney (UK Parliament constituency)